Udara Warna (born 11 March 1984) is a Sri Lankan former cricketer. He played in 32 first-class and 34 List A matches between 2001/02 and 2010/11. He made his Twenty20 debut on 17 August 2004, for Bloomfield Cricket and Athletic Club in the 2004 SLC Twenty20 Tournament.

References

External links
 

1984 births
Living people
Sri Lankan cricketers
Bloomfield Cricket and Athletic Club cricketers
Nondescripts Cricket Club cricketers
Saracens Sports Club cricketers
Place of birth missing (living people)